Dardan or Dardans may refer to:
Dardanoi, an ancient people of the Troad
Dardani, an ancient people of the Balkans
Dardan (given name)
Dardan Mushkolaj, German-Albanian rapper
Constantin Dardan, Moldovan politician
Hoseynabad-e Dardan, a village in Iran

See also
Dardanus (disambiguation)
Dardania (disambiguation)
Kamenica, Kosovo, Albanian name Dardana or Dardanë